Bettina Maria Sågbom-Ek (born 1 September 1965 in Hanko) is a Swedish-speaking Finnish journalist. She is the host of the talk show Bettina S., which is aired on the Finnish national television network Yle Fem. 

Sågbom married and has two children.

References

External links 
 Bettina Sågbom's Profile in Yle Fem (in Swedish)

1966 births
Living people
People from Hanko
Swedish-speaking Finns
Finnish journalists
Finnish women journalists